Žlutice is a town in Karlovy Vary District in the Karlovy Vary Region of the Czech Republic. It has about 2,200 inhabitants. The historic town centre is well preserved and is protected by law as urban monument zone.

Administrative parts
Villages of Knínice, Protivec, Ratiboř, Skoky, Verušice, Veselov, Vladořice and Záhořice are administrative parts of Žlutice.

Notable people
Emanuel Wirth (1842–1923), German violinist

Twin towns – sister cities

Žlutice is twinned with:
 Hurbanovo, Slovakia
 Warmensteinach, Germany

References

Cities and towns in the Czech Republic